This is a list of the world's largest machines, both static and movable in history.

Building structure
 Large Hadron Collider – The world's largest single machine

Ground vehicles

Mining vehicles

Engineering and transport vehicles

Military vehicles

Air vehicles

Lighter-than-air vehicles

Heavier-than-air vehicles

Sea vehicles

Industrial and cargo vessels

Passenger vessels

Military vessels

Space vehicles

Space stations

Launch vehicles

See also
List of largest passenger vehicles
List of large aircraft

References

Machines
Largest
Technology-related lists
Transport-related lists of superlatives